Emmanuel John Bandick Dankwa (affectionately known as Sony Achiba, Oseikrom Prince Charles and Indian Man) is a Ghanaian-born Bristish hiplife artist and dancer. He is the first Ghanaian to combine hip hop, hi-life and Indian style of music in Ghana and beyond.

Early life and education 
Achiba was born in Kumasi in the Ashanti Region of Ghana to J. B. Danquah and Akia Frema. He had both his primary and secondary education in Kumasi. He attended Kumasi Technical Institute without completing due to financial issues. He also attended Osei Tutu Senior High School. In 2018, he attended the Buckinghamshire New University and graduated in 2022 with a degree in Business Management.

Career 
His career began as a dancer after he had an accident on his left leg playing football. He performed with other Ghanaian musicians such as Tommy Wiredu, Frank Mensah Pozo, Rex Omar, George Jahraa, Nana Tuffour, Ama Badu, Randy Noonoo and others. In 2000, he launched his first album. Two years later, Achiba launched another album called HIP-DIA. He is currently a music producer and has signed a new artist called Queen Peezy (Lady Blue).

Discography

Albums 
 Indian Ocean 1 (2001)
 Indian Ocean 2
 Indian Ocean 3

Songs 
 Sony maba
 Nipa Boniayefo (Onipa Boniayefuor)
 Gyamera Woyare
 Ekbar Daraw Bondhu (feat. Ash Boii & Sony Achiba)
 Fufuo
 Wo Ne Medofo

Hobbies 
Achiba likes watching movies, making friends and listening to music.

Allegation 
Achiba accused Fiifi Banson for 'killing' his music career. Achiba claimed Fiifi Banson spoke ill of his song Wo Ne Medofo live on air which affected his music career negatively.  Fiifi Banson later apologized to Achiba.

References 

Living people
Ghanaian musicians
Ghanaian record producers
Year of birth missing (living people)